Article 155 of the Constitution of Spain grants the government of Spain a coercive mechanism to force an autonomous community to comply with the law when it severely contravenes the Constitution of Spain or other laws, or when its actions seriously threaten the general interest of Spain. The article is inspired by the mechanism of "federal coercion" (Bundeszwang) provided in article 37 of the Basic Law of the Federal Republic of Germany. By means of this article, Catalan autonomy was intervened between 27 October 2017 and 2 June 2018.

This legal provision became notable after it was activated by the Spanish Senate to dismiss the Government of Catalonia and dissolve Parliament after the proclamation of a Catalan declaration of independence on 27 October 2017. The Constitutional Court ruled the declaration to be null and void, an opinion shared by a significant number of legal scholars. The declaration was not recognized by the international community.

In a ruling issued on 5 July 2019, the Constitutional Court established that Article 155 is an "exceptional and subsidiary remedy" that must be limited in time. There is no possibility of a general and permanent suspension of self-government, as it would contravene the right to autonomy guaranteed in the Constitution.

See also
 Constitution of Spain
 Politics of Spain

References

Constitutions of Spain
Politics of Spain